HMS Saltash was an 8-gun two-masted sloop of the Royal Navy, built on speculation by Henry Bird at Deptford Wet Dock on the Thames River, England. She was purchased while building by the Navy Board at the end of August 1741 to replace the 1732-built sloop of the same name (which was sold on 24 August). The new sloop was launched on 3 September.

She was commissioned in 1741 under Commander Peter Toms, and sailed for the Straits of Gibraltar. In 1742 she was under Commander Arthur Upton; she grounded in the Gulf of Cadiz on 16 April 1742 while chasing a Spanish polacca and was burnt by her crew two days later to prevent capture by the Spanish.

References
 
 McLaughlan, Ian. The Sloop of War 1650-1763. Seaforth Publishing, 2014. .
 Rif Winfield (2007). British Warships in the Age of Sail, 1714-1792: Design, Construction, Careers and Fates. Seaforth Publishing. .

Sloops of the Royal Navy
1741 ships
Maritime incidents in 1742